Senator Merrill may refer to:

Amanda Merrill (born 1951), New Hampshire State Senate
George F. Merrill (1847–1941), Wisconsin State Senate
Henry Merrill (1804–1874), Wisconsin State Senate
Orsamus Cook Merrill (1775–1865), Vermont State Senate